"Blessed Be Your Name" is a song by English Christian singer-songwriters Matt Redman and Beth Redman and performed by Matt Redman. The track appeared in Redman's 2002 album Where Angels Fear to Tread on Worship Together label. The Matt Redman track was not released as a single.

The song was covered as a single in 2003 by the South African Christian band Tree63. That version peaked at number 2 on the US Billboard Christian Songs chart, becoming their first and biggest chart success. The single stayed 68 weeks on that same chart.  They included the track in their follow up album in 2004 titled The Answer to the Question. Their version is included on WOW Hits 2005. Also in 2004, Newsboys covered the song for their Devotion album.

The song has reappeared on later compilations albums, specifically on the Matt Redman 2005 compilation album Blessed Be Your Name: The Songs of Matt Redman Vol. 1 released on Survivor Records and in 2008, in Tree63's compilation album Blessed Be Your Name: The Hits released on Inpop Records.

Awards
In 2005, the song won GMA Dove Award for Worship Song of the Year.

Charts

Weekly charts

Year-end charts

Decade-end charts

References

2002 songs
2003 singles